Shalilvand (also Romanized as Shalīlvand; also known as Shalīvand and Shīlūneh) is a village in Sarajuy-ye Shomali Rural District, in the Central District of Maragheh County, East Azerbaijan Province, Iran. At the 2006 census, its population was 1,036, in 241 families.

References 

Towns and villages in Maragheh County